Brasher can refer to:
 Brasher (surname), people and fictional characters with the name
 Brasher, New York, a town
 Brasher, a UK boot manufacturer owned by the Pentland Group

See also 
 Brasher Doubloon, a rare, privately minted American coin
 The Brasher Doubloon, a 1947 film
 Brash (disambiguation)
 Brasch, a surname